Lowes Barn or Lowe's Barn is a suburb of the city of Durham in County Durham, England. It lies to the south-west of Durham and is linked with Neville's Cross.

References

Villages in County Durham